Sandra Bagarić (born 5 April 1974) is a Bosnian-born Croatian opera singer and actress. She was born in Zenica, Bosnia and Herzegovina where she attended the High School for Music. She continued her musical studies in Sarajevo, but due to the Bosnian War moved to Zagreb in 1992.  In Zagreb she attended the Music Academy. She sang in many operas including Madame Troubadour, Countess Maritza, Die Fledermaus, Boccaccio and One Song a Day Takes Mischief Away. She participated in Dora 2007, together with Kraljevi ulice. They performed "Pjesma za novčić" (Song for a Coin) and finished second overall.

Filmography

Television

Dubbing

References

escdaily.com. Croatia: Results of the second heat
EZadar (3 July 2008). Sandra Bagarić: U Pagu sam zaprosila svog supruga 

Living people
1974 births
Musicians from Zenica
Croats of Bosnia and Herzegovina
Bosnia and Herzegovina opera singers
Bosnia and Herzegovina emigrants to Croatia
21st-century Croatian women opera singers
Croatian sopranos
Croatian voice actresses